Sinumerik were a series of Siemens CNC (computer numerical control) control systems.

Sinumerik System 8
During the early to late 1980s the Sinumerik "System 8" used G-code to control industrial systems. The models included:
SINUMERIK 8M/8ME
SINUMERIK 8T/8TE
SINUMERIK Sprint 8T/8TE
SINUMERIK Sprint 8M/8ME
SINUMERIK Sprint 8MC/MCE

Sinumerik System 3
In the late 1980s the models included:
SINUMERIK 3T/3TT

The family comprises
 SINUMERIK 802D sl — a CNC system, combining CNC, PLC and HMI. The panel has 5 axes and is therefore used in standard lathes, grinders and milling machines. Programmable using DIN codes with programming support elements, ShopMill/ShopTurn step-by-step programming.
 SINUMERIK 828D Together with the SINAMICS S120 Combi drive, it is a system for compact, modern CNC machines. Characterised by loss-free data exchange with NX CAM, 80-bit precision machining (NANO FP). The system is available in two versions. SINUMERIK 828D has a built-in web server that allows access to the device from any networked computer and also supports IPv4 and IPv6. 
 SINUMERIK 840D sl — a CNC controller, connected to SINAMICS S120 drives via DRIVE-CLIQ (connected to the HUB). It has integrated CNC and PLC numerical control components. It supports and regulates 6 CNC measuring circuits, controls up to 8 axes/spindles on the lathe, can support up to 31 axes/spindles in 10 machining channels. The machining accuracy is 80 bit with NANO technology with volumetric compensation VCS Plus. Applications: turning, milling, grinding, laser machining, cutting or punching.
 SINUMERIK 840Di - a numerical controller based on an industrial computer with integrated PLC functions and a drive connector. It is used in machine tools, special devices, machine controls and retrofits, and in particular in applications that require the integration of CNC control functions on the computer. The SINUMERIK 840Si sl can control up to twenty axes. Communication is via USB interface or industrial Ethernet, PROFINET and PROFIBUS-DP.
 SINAMICS S120 - a modular drive system for use in the construction of industrial machinery and equipment. Communication via DRIVE-CLIQ, PROFIBUS-DP and PROFINET. System power and voltage range 12-250 kW at 1AC 230V, 3AC 380-480V

See also
History of numerical control

External links
SINUMERIK System 8: Operating Manual, Operating Instructions
Sinumerik System 3 Manuals

References

 
 
 

 
Siemens software products